Muhammad Abdallah Hasan Abu-al-Khayr, also known as Abu Abdallah al-Halabi, was a citizen of Saudi Arabia notable for being named on its 2009 list of most wanted suspected terrorists.
He was alleged to be one of Osama bin Laden's bodyguards, and one of his sons-in-law.

Background
According to Asharq Alawsat Mohamed
Abu-al-Khayr had "established ties with 9/11 hijacker Ramzi Bin al-Shaiba".
They report he: "is currently believed to be in the Iranian-Afghan-Pakistani triangle."

On August 24, 2010, the Long War Journal reported that both the United States and United Nations had entered "Muhammad Abdallah Hasan Abu al Khayr"
on their lists of terrorist suspects whose financial assets should be frozen, world-wide.
The Long War Journal describes him as "a top financial official in the terror organization."
The United Nations 1267 list was established by United Nations Security Council Resolution 1267, in 1999, but is regularly updated, with new individuals being added as needed, and with defectors, or individuals known to have died being removed.
The United States list was established by United States President George W. Bush's Presidential Executive Order 13224.

The Long War Journal noted the Treasury called Abu-al-Khayr "a key leader of the terrorist organization's finance section" who "also acts for al Qaeda in a leadership role on the media committee."

On July 29, 2011, a poster on an al-Qaeda-linked forum claimed that Abu al-Khayr was killed on an unspecified date. A letter retrieved from the compound where Bin Laden was killed in Abbottabad, Pakistan confirmed that Abu-al-Khayr was killed in a drone strike in Pakistan on September 18, 2010.

References

1975 births
2010 deaths
Assassinated al-Qaeda leaders
Fugitives
Fugitives wanted by Saudi Arabia
Named on Saudi Arabia's list of most wanted suspected terrorists
People from Medina
Saudi Arabian al-Qaeda members